Sarand may refer to:
 Sáránd, Hungary
 Sarand, Iran (disambiguation)
 Sărand (Hungarian: Szaránd), a village in the commune Copăcel, Romania
 Sărand, a river in Bihor County, Romania